The red scarf is a neckerchief worn by young pioneers of several countries during the communist era. In the Soviet Union it was known as pionerskiy galstuk (пионерский галстук, i. e. pioneer's neckerchief), in Vietnam as khăn quàng đỏ (red scarf), in China as hóng lǐngjīn (紅領巾/红领巾，red scarf), in Cuba as pañoleta roja (red scarf), and in Hungary as úttörőnyakkendő (pioneer's neckerchief). Blue scarves were also used by youngsters before coming of age to wear the red one, and are still seen in some countries.

Background

It remains in use by the young pioneer organizations of China, Vietnam, North Korea, and Cuba, and — unofficially, on occasions — in many other countries, such as Russia, Venezuela, Zimbabwe, Belarus, Ukraine, Finland etc. In China, the scarf is emblematic of blood of revolutionary Red Guards, as recalled in Red Scarf Park and the title of Red Scarf Girl by Ji-li Jiang about her experiences during the Cultural Revolution. In Cuba, the scarf is worn by schoolchildren from first to sixth grade.

Other users
A red scarf was introduced into the Republic of Korea Air Force as a device to aid visual location of downed South Korean airmen, it became and remains an iconic item of uniform in the Republic of Korea Air Force.

Foulards Rouges 
A red scarf ("foulard rouge") was adopted as the symbol of those counter-protesting the excesses and violence of the yellow vests movement ("gilets jaunes").

Gallery

References

External links

Scarves
Communism
Marxism–Leninism